Li Zhaoxing (born 20 October 1940 in Jiaonan, Qingdao, Shandong) is a Chinese diplomat and politician. He served as the Foreign Minister of the People's Republic of China from 2003 to 2007.

He graduated from Peking University in 1964.  He worked as a diplomat in Africa before becoming Assistant Minister of Foreign Affairs in 1990 and Vice Minister of Foreign Affairs in 1995, permanent representative to the United Nations in 1993, ambassador to the United States in 1998, and Foreign Minister in 2003.

He was initially appointed as one of the Elders but chose not to continue with the role. He is a professor at Peking University. He is married, and has one son.

See also 
 People's Republic of China diplomatic missions

References

External links 
 Biography, China Vitae
 Biography, China Today

|-

|-

1940 births
Ambassadors of China to the United States
Beijing Foreign Studies University alumni
Chinese Communist Party politicians from Shandong
Foreign Ministers of the People's Republic of China
Living people
Peking University alumni
People's Republic of China politicians from Shandong
Permanent Representatives of the People's Republic of China to the United Nations
Politicians from Qingdao
20th-century Chinese politicians
21st-century Chinese politicians
Diplomats of the People's Republic of China